Caleta Tortel is a coastal village in Chile. It is the administrative centre of the commune of Tortel and is located between the mouth of the Baker River the largest river in Chile and a small embayment of the Baker Channel. The surrounding geography is rugged, formed by a number of islands, fjords, channels and estuaries. The village was founded in 1955 to exploit the cypress de las guaytecas or Guaytecas Cypress (Pilgerodendron uviferum) wood that was abundant in the area. The timber business accounts for most of the economy in Tortel to this day. For most of its history the village had only air and boat access; the road was constructed only in 2003, and connects Caleta Tortel with the Carretera Austral.

Caleta Tortel consists mainly of stilt houses, typical of Chilotan architecture, built along the coast for several kilometers. There are no conventional streets - instead there are wooden walkways build with Guaitecas Cypress. The wooden walkways give the village its distinctive look and its unique culture.

There is one school in Caleta Tortel, called Escuela Comandante Luis Bravo Bravo, inaugurated by the Chilean Navy in 1978 it runs up to 8th grade and has about 90 students total. There are no banks or cash points except for BancoEstado clients, but there is Entel cellphone coverage, line phones and access to the internet including free WiFi at the public library. There is a rural health centre, police checkpoint, fire-fighters, harbour master, municipality and civil registration.

Boat tours to Jorge Montt Glacier and other places are available from the village. The village is served by a nearby Río Bravo Airport; the airstrip is 600m long and 23m wide.

See also

 Tortel
 Northern Patagonian Ice Field
 Southern Patagonian Ice Field
 Guayaneco Archipelago

References

External links
 *  Tortel walkways in Living Atlas Chile
 https://web.archive.org/web/20080412025801/http://lavozdetortel.patagones.cl/ La Voz de Tortel

Communes of Chile
Populated places in Capitán Prat Province
Geography of Aysén Region
Ports and harbours of Chile
National Monuments of Chile in Aysén Region
Populated places in the fjords and channels of Chile